In the United Kingdom, government policy requires that staff undergo security vetting in order to gain access to government information.

The government uses four levels of personnel security controls depending on the level of assurance required. Three of these levels are types of national security vetting clearance.
 
Vetting is intended to assure government bodies that the individual has not been involved in espionage, terrorism, sabotage or actions intended to overthrow or undermine Parliamentary democracy by political, industrial or violent means.  It also assures the department that the individual has not been a member of, or associated with, an organisation which has advocated such activities or has demonstrated a lack of reliability through dishonesty, lack of integrity or behaviour. Finally, the process assures the department that the individual will not be subject to pressure or improper influence through past behaviour or personal circumstances.

Vetting is usually carried out by United Kingdom Security Vetting (UKSV), a department within the Cabinet Office. UKSV was created in January 2017 by combining DBS National Security Vetting (DBS NSV) and FCO Services National Security Vetting (FCOS NSV). This change was an outcome of the Strategic Defence and Security Review 2015.

Security and intelligence agencies such as MI5, MI6 and Government Communications Headquarters carry out their own vetting. The minimum is Developed Vetting and very occasionally Enhanced Security Check.

It is possible to pass vetting with one department yet fail it with another as vetting is tailored to the role/department. Clearances can be transferred between departments. Holders of vetting clearance may face travel restrictions on private travel to high-risk countries.

Vetting in the UK is currently undergoing change as part of the Vetting Transformation Programme. This will see a series of "Levels" introduced and the phasing out of the current nomenclature. These new levels will be broadly:

 BPSS = Level 1A
 CTC = Level 1B
 SC = Level 2
 DV = Level 3

The target date for this transformation is 2025. Level 1B was introduced October 2022 and is currently the only "new" level operating.

Types of personnel security check

Baseline Personnel Security Standard (BPSS)

The Baseline Personnel Security Standard (BPSS) checks are normally performed when a person is recruited.

All those with access to government assets are subject on recruitment to the requirements of the Baseline Personnel Security Standard. This includes all applicants for employment in the civil service and armed forces and applies to both permanent and temporary staff and private sector employees working on government contracts, with access to government assets.

The Baseline Personnel Security Standard requires the verification of the following four elements:
 Identity
 Employment history (past three years)
 Nationality and immigration status
 Criminal record (unspent convictions only)

A reasonable account of any significant periods (a total of 6 months or more in the past 3 years) spent abroad. Prospective employees who have recently come to the UK or lived abroad may be asked to provide overseas police certificates of good conduct.

BPSS
 Allows access to UK OFFICIAL assets and occasional access to UK SECRET assets
 Is required to work in areas where SECRET and TOP SECRET information may be overheard 
 Allows individuals who require it, access to the Public Services Network (PSN)

Employers may initiate the following incremental national security vetting checks on recruits after performing the BPSS check.

Counter Terrorist Check (CTC)/Level 1B

A Counter Terrorist Check (CTC)/Level 1B is required for individuals who are employed in posts that: 
 Involve proximity to public figures assessed to be at particular risk from terrorist attack.
 Give access to information or material assessed to be of value to terrorists. However, it is not designed to manage access to sensitive information.
 Involve unescorted access to certain military, civil, industrial or commercial establishments assessed to be at particular risk from terrorist attack.

The process for CTC clearance includes:
 BPSS check;
 Completion of a security clearance questionnaire by the candidate;
 Checks against UK criminal records covering both spent and unspent convictions;
 Checks against Security Service (MI5) records;
 It may also include an interview.

A CTC/Level 1B clearance must be formally reviewed after ten years (five years for non-List X Contractors).

In the transport sector security vetting requirements, including for Counter Terrorist Check, is regulated by the Department of Transport.

A CTC/Level 1B is required for police officers and many associated staff.

Security Check (SC)

A Security Check (SC) is the most widely held level of security clearance. SC is required for posts involving regular and uncontrolled access to SECRET assets and/or occasional, supervised access to TOP SECRET assets, and for individuals who:
 While not in such posts, will be in a position to directly or indirectly bring about the same degree of damage. 
 Will have sufficient knowledge to obtain a comprehensive picture of a SECRET plan, policy or project. 
 Are being considered for employment where it would not be possible to make reasonable career progress without security clearance for access to SECRET assets. 
 Require access to certain levels of classified material originating from another country or international organisation.

The process for SC clearance includes:
 Successful completion of the Baseline Personnel Security Standard. 
 Completion, by the individual, of a Security Questionnaire. 
 A departmental/company records check which will include e.g. personal files, staff reports, sick leave returns and security records. 
 A check of both spent and unspent criminal records. 
 A check of credit and financial history with a credit reference agency.
 A check of Security Service (MI5) records.
 Checks on foreign travel/foreign contacts. 
 It may also include an interview.

Checks may extend to third parties included on the security questionnaire.

An SC security clearance must be formally reviewed after ten years (seven years for non-List X contractors) or at any time up to that point at the discretion of the vetting authority.

Enhanced Security Check (eSC)

This is similar to an SC but also includes a financial questionnaire and may include an interview with a vetting officer. It is a pre-requisite for the granting of access to STRAP codeword material at the SECRET level.

Developed Vetting (DV)

DV is one of the most detailed and comprehensive form of security clearance in UK government. It is needed for posts that require individuals to have frequent and uncontrolled access to TOP SECRET assets, or require any access to TOP SECRET codeword material. It is also required for individuals who: 
 While not in such posts, will be in a position to directly or indirectly bring about the same degree of damage. 
 Require frequent and uncontrolled access to Category I nuclear material. 
 Require access to certain levels of classified material originating from another country or international organisation.

The process for DV clearance includes:
 BPSS check. 
 Completion, by the individual, of a Security Questionnaire, a DV Supplement and Financial Questionnaire. 
 A check of both spent and unspent criminal records. 
 A check of credit and financial history with a credit reference agency. 
 A check of Security Service (MI5) records.
 A full review of personal finances. 
 Checks on foreign travel/foreign contacts. 
 A detailed interview conducted by a vetting officer. 
 Further enquiries, including interviews with referees conducted by a vetting officer.

A DV security clearance must be reviewed every seven years or at any time up to those points at the discretion of the vetting authority.

Enhanced Developed Vetting (eDV)

Enhanced Developed Vetting requires additional in-depth interviews, beyond that of DV, including a full list of all foreign travel within the last 10 years. It is required for a limited number of highly sensitive roles and can only be requested by a small number of government departments.

STRAP

STRAP is a code-word, combined with SECRET or TOP SECRET, to further restrict access to particularly sensitive material. 

Access is granted to certain holders of Enhanced SC (eSC) or (Enhanced) Developed Vetting (DV/eDV) clearance, allowing them to access SECRET/TOP SECRET STRAP code-word material:
Relevant to a particular organisation (STRAP1)
Team (STRAP2)
Role - such as "Cabinet Secretary" (STRAP3A)
Named specific individuals only (STRAP3B) 

This is commonly referred to as holding "STRAP Clearance". 

Whilst comparatively little is known of the requirements to obtain such a level of clearance, it is mentioned by UK government bodies on occasion in recruitment, policy and procurement documents.

Codewords

A number of other codewords are used within the UK clearance system, which individuals may be "read in" to and further restrict access to material; these include:
 LIMDIS
 TK (United States SCI Codeword); 
 PSA
 NNPPI
 ATOMIC
 LOCSEN

Caveats/Nationality Restrictions

A clearance of any level can be granted with "caveats" which may restrict the holder from accessing certain types of material, for example relating to specific countries, regions or projects. Where there is an explicit requirement for the viewer of a document to be a UK Citizen, the individual must hold a clearance with no "caveats" and be deemed to meet "UK Eyes Only". Further restrictions can include "No Dual Nationals".

Clearance Aftercare

Change of personal circumstances

A change of personal circumstances (CPC) questionnaire has to be submitted when a CTC, SC, eSC, DV, eDV, STRAP clearance holder is "marrying, remarrying, entering into a civil partnership, setting up a stable unmarried relationship which includes living with someone as a couple", "due to significant changes in financial circumstances" or "due to contact with law enforcement". DV clearance holders also have to report the arrival of new "co-residents" such as a lodger or flatmate.

Annual Security Appraisals/Aftercare Reports

Holders of eSC, DV and eDV must annually complete a "Security Appraisal Form" (SAF) in conjunction with their line management, detailing any areas of concern or changes in circumstances that have occurred in the previous year which have yet to be notified to UKSV. 

Any issues that require immediate notification to UKSV during the year are either self-reported as a change in circumstances, or if caused by a security issues filed as an "Aftercare Incident Report".

Transfer of a clearance

A request can be made to transfer national security clearances between organisations, providing they have not expired. Transfers are requested by the "new employing sponsor". Transfers can be the same level of clearance or a lower level clearance can be "extracted" from a higher level clearance (usually SC extracted from DV). No more than twelve months must have elapsed since the holder left the organisation for which the clearance was originally granted and no more than six months spent living overseas. New completed change of circumstances questionnaires, to bring the UKSV and departmental records up to date, may be required. The new sponsor reviews the details of the clearance and decides if it is acceptable for the specific new role.

Other Checks

Disclosure and Barring

In addition to national security clearances, other types of roles and organisations stipulate a need for background checks, these are often required for vulnerable group access (including children), as operated by the Disclosure and Barring Service (DBS), replacing former Criminal Records Bureau (CRB) and Independent Safeguarding Authority (ISA) checks.

Police Vetting

The police service has its own system of vetting:

Force Vetting with a hierarchy of Police Personnel Vetting (PPV) and Non-Police Personnel Vetting (NPPV) levels.

Within this there are several levels. For police officers, there is:
 Recruitment Vetting; and
 Management Vetting

For civilian police staff and contractors, there is "non-police personnel vetting":
 NPPV Level 1 (NPPV1)
 NPPV Level 2 (NPPV2)
 NPPV Level 3 (NPPV3) (aligned but not equivalent to SC)

When an actual SC, eSC, or DV is required alongside Force Vetting, it is carried out by UKSV.

References 

Security vetting
Government of the United Kingdom
Information sensitivity
Public policy in the United Kingdom
National security of the United Kingdom